Raymond "Ryan" Pannone (born January 28, 1985) is an American professional basketball coach who currently serves as an assistant coach for the New Orleans Pelicans of the National Basketball Association (NBA).

Coaching career 
A native of Clearwater, Florida, Pannone served as assistant coach at Oldsmar Christian School in Oldsmar, Florida from 2003 to 2006. After working as a coach on the AAU circuit, he returned to Oldsmar Christian School, where he worked as head coach from 2006 to 2011, compiling a record of 131-42 during his five-year tenure.

In the 2011-12 season, Pannone served as assistant coach at Wallace State Community College in Hanceville, Alabama and then moved to China to accept the assistant coaching job with the Foshan Long Lions of the Chinese Basketball Association (CBA). At Foshan, he worked under head coach Joe Whelton. In 2013, Pannone worked as an assistant coach for the Memphis Grizzlies in the NBA Summer League in Las Vegas, Nevada. He worked for the Erie BayHawks in the NBA D-League, followed by a one-year tenure as assistant coach at German ProA side WhiteWings Hanau. Between 2015 and 2017, he also spent some time working for the LG Lakers in South Korea.

In the 2016-17 campaign, Pannone served as assistant coach for Hapoel Jerusalem of Israel’s top-tier. He won the Israeli championship with Hapoel and reached the EuroCup semifinals in 2016-17. He was named head coach of BC Prievidza of the Slovak Basketball League, the top-tier league in Slovakia, in June 2017 and stayed on that job until the end of the 2017-18 season. In August 2018, he returned to Hapoel Jerusalem to rejoin their staff as an assistant coach. He also became of member of the coaching staff of the Angola men's national team, serving as scout and video coordinator.

As a player development coach, he has worked with numerous NBA players.

In 2019, Pannone was a member of the New Orleans Pelicans' NBA Summer League coaching staff. In August 2019, he was named head coach of the Pelicans' new NBA G League affiliate, the Erie BayHawks. He continued as head coach when the BayHawks relocated to Birmingham, Alabama, as the Birmingham Squadron in 2021.

In September 2022, he took an assistant coach position with the NBA's New Orleans Pelicans.

References 

1985 births
Living people
American expatriate basketball people in Slovakia
American men's basketball coaches
Basketball coaches from Florida
Birmingham Squadron coaches
Erie BayHawks (2019–2021) coaches
Sportspeople from Clearwater, Florida
University of South Florida alumni
Wallace State Community College